United States gubernatorial elections were held on November 4, 2014, in 36 states and three territories, concurrent with other elections during the 2014 United States elections.

The Republicans defended 22 seats, compared to the Democrats' 14. The Republicans held open seats in Arizona, Nebraska, and Texas; and gained open Democratic-held seats in Massachusetts, Maryland, and Arkansas. Republican Bruce Rauner also defeated Democratic incumbent Pat Quinn in Illinois. The only Republican losses were incumbents Tom Corbett of Pennsylvania, who lost to Democrat Tom Wolf; and Sean Parnell of Alaska, who lost to independent Bill Walker. Democrats held their open seat in Rhode Island, as well as Hawaii, where incumbent Governor Neil Abercrombie was defeated in the primary.

All totaled, the Republicans had a net gain of two seats (giving them 31 total), the Democrats had a net loss of three seats (leaving them with 18 total), and an independent picked up one seat (giving them 1 total). As a result of these races, Republican Terry Branstad was re-elected to his sixth full four-year term as governor of Iowa, and thus became the longest-serving governor in U.S. history.

This is also the last time that the Republicans have made a net gain of governorships in a midterm election, and the last time that a candidate outside of the two major parties has won the governorship of any state.

Predictions

Race summary

States
Data from The New York Times

Territories and Federal District

Closest races 
States where the margin of victory was under 5%:

 Florida, 1.0%
 Vermont, 1.3%
 Massachusetts, 1.9%
 Alaska, 2.2%
 Connecticut, 2.5%
 Colorado, 3.3%
 Kansas, 3.7%
 Maryland, 3.8%
 Illinois, 3.9%
 Michigan, 4.0%
 Rhode Island, 4.5%
 Maine, 4.8%

States where the margin of victory was under 10%:

 New Hampshire, 5.0%
 Minnesota, 5.6%
 Wisconsin, 5.7%
 Oregon, 5.8%
 Georgia, 7.8%
 Pennsylvania, 9.8%

Red denotes states won by Republicans. Blue denotes states won by Democrats. Grey denotes states won by Independents.

Alabama 

Governor Robert Bentley ran for re-election. Bentley was elected with 57.9% of the vote in 2010.

Former Morgan County Commissioner Stacy Lee George challenged Bentley in the Republican primary, as did Bob Starkey, a retired software company executive.

Former baseball player and businessman Kevin Bass and former U.S. Representative Parker Griffith pursued the Democratic nomination, which Griffith won.

Bentley won re-election to a second term.

Alaska 

Governor Sean Parnell ran for another term. Attorney and 2010 Republican primary candidate Bill Walker at first ran in the Republican primary, but withdrew and instead ran as an independent. Governor Parnell was defeated by Independent Bill Walker.

Former Mayor of Juneau Byron Mallott won the Democratic gubernatorial primary on August 19 with 80% of the vote. On September 2, Walker and Mallott merged their campaigns, with Walker, who ran for governor and Mallott, who ran for lieutenant governor.

Arizona 

Governor Jan Brewer was term-limited in 2014 despite only serving one full term, as Arizona state law limits office holders to two consecutive terms, regardless of whether they are full or partial terms.  In November 2012, Brewer declared she was looking into what she called "ambiguity" in Arizona's term-limit law to seek a second full four-year term.

On March 12, 2014, Brewer announced she would not seek re-election to another four-year term, which would have required a "longshot court challenge" to the Arizona Constitution.

Arizona Secretary of State Ken Bennett, Mesa Mayor Scott Smith, State Treasurer of Arizona Doug Ducey, State Senator Al Melvin, former Go Daddy Executive Vice President Christine Jones, and former County attorney of Maricopa County Andrew Thomas sought the Republican nomination. Ducey won.

Fred DuVal, former Chairman of the Arizona Board of Regents won the Democratic nomination.

Ducey won the election.

Arkansas 

Governor Mike Beebe was term-limited in 2014. Former Representative Mike Ross is the Democratic nominee, while former Representative Asa Hutchinson is the Republican nominee.

Hutchinson won the election.

California 

Governor Jerry Brown sought re-election. He was elected to a third non-consecutive term with 53.1% of the vote in 2010, having previously served as governor from 1975 to 1983.

State Assemblyman Tim Donnelly and former U.S. Treasury Department Official Neel Kashkari were running for the Republican nomination. Former Lieutenant Governor Abel Maldonado launched a campaign but then withdrew. With 19 percent of the vote Kashkari came in second after Governor Jerry Brown (54 percent) under California's new Nonpartisan blanket primary.

Colorado 

Governor John Hickenlooper sought for re-election. Hickenlooper was elected with 50.7% of the vote in 2010.

State Senator Greg Brophy and Former Congressman Tom Tancredo are running for the Republican nomination. Colorado Secretary of State Scott Gessler is a potential Republican candidate.

Hickenlooper won re-election to a second term.

Connecticut 

Governor Dan Malloy sought re-election. Malloy was elected with 49.51% of the vote in 2010.

Former U.S. ambassador to Ireland and 2010 Republican gubernatorial candidate Tom Foley is challenging Malloy again after losing by less than 1% of the vote in 2010.

Malloy won re-election to a second term.

Florida 

Governor Rick Scott was elected with 48.9% of the vote in 2010, defeating then-Chief Financial Officer of Florida Alex Sink by a margin of just over 1 percent. He announced his bid for a second term and is facing former Republican Governor turned Democrat Charlie Crist and Libertarian Adrian Wyllie.

Democratic State Senator Nan Rich lost to Charlie Crist in the primary.

Economist and 2010 Independent nominee for governor Farid Khavari is also running.

Georgia 

Governor Nathan Deal sought re-election. Deal was elected with 53% of the vote in 2010.

State School Superintendent John Barge and Mayor of Dalton David Pennington are running for the Republican nomination.

State Senator Jason Carter, the grandson of former president and Governor Jimmy Carter, ran for the Democratic nomination. Connie Stokes, a former Georgia State Senator and DeKalb County Commissioner, was running for governor, but is now running for lieutenant governor. Carter won the gubernatorial nomination.

Deal won re-election to a second term.

Hawaii 

Governor Neil Abercrombie launched his re-election campaign on April 29, 2013; sought a second term in 2014. Abercrombie was elected with 58.2% of the vote in 2010 over former Lieutenant Governor Duke Aiona. However, in 2014, State Senator David Ige challenged Abercrombie for the Democratic nomination, and successfully defeated Abercrombie for the nomination in a landslide victory during the state's primary election on August 9, 2014. Abercrombie's primary election defeat was the first in Hawaii history for a governor, and marked the first time an incumbent governor lost re-election since 1962.

In the midst of Abercrombie's loss, former Lieutenant Governor Duke Aiona won the Republican nomination for governor for the second time, and former Honolulu mayor Mufi Hannemann won his primary as an independent. They along with David Ige advanced to the gubernatorial general election. Ige won the election.

Idaho 

Governor Butch Otter sought a third term. Otter was elected to a second term with 59.1% of the vote in 2010. State Senator Russ Fulcher unsuccessfully challenged Otter for the Republican nomination.

A. J. Balukoff, President of the Boise School Board, won the Democratic nomination.

Otter won re-election to a third term.

Illinois 

Democratic Governor Pat Quinn sought re-election, but was defeated by Businessman Bruce Rauner. Quinn was elected to a full term with 46.6% of the vote in 2010.

Businessman Bruce Rauner, Treasurer Dan Rutherford, and State Senators Kirk Dillard and Bill Brady are running for the Republican nomination.

On March 18, 2014, Bruce Rauner won the primary and the GOP nomination with 40.1% of the vote.

Iowa 

Governor Terry Branstad sought a sixth non-consecutive term. He was elected to a fifth term (non-consecutive) with 53% of the vote in 2010.  Political activist Tom Hoefling unsuccessfully challenged Branstad for the Republican nomination.

Assistant Majority Leader of the Iowa State Senate Jack Hatch former Des Moines school board member Jonathan Narcisse and Webster bus driver Paul Dahl, sought the Democratic nomination. Hatch won.

Branstad won re-election and became the longest-serving governor in US history.

Kansas 

Governor Sam Brownback sought re-election. Brownback was elected with 63.4% of the vote in 2010. He easily won the Republican nomination.

Paul Davis, Minority Leader of the Kansas House of Representatives, successfully ran for the Democratic nomination. According to The Fix, Democrats see this as the "sleeper race" of 2014.

Brownback won re-election to a second term.

Maine 

Governor Paul LePage sought a second term. LePage was elected with 38.3% of the vote in a competitive three member race in 2010. He easily won the Republican nomination.

Representative Mike Michaud successfully ran for the Democratic nomination. Independent candidate Eliot Cutler, who finished second in Maine's 2010 gubernatorial election, is running again against LePage.

LePage won re-election to a second term.

Maryland 

Governor Martin O'Malley was term-limited in 2014.

O'Malley endorsed Lieutenant Governor Anthony Brown to succeed him. Attorney General Douglas Gansler and State Delegate Heather Mizeur sought the Democratic nomination as well.

On the Republican side, candidates had included Harford County Executive David R. Craig, Chairman of Change Maryland and former Maryland Secretary of Appointments Larry Hogan, Delegate Ron George, former Charles County Republican Central Committee Chairman Charles Lollar, and 2012 U.S. Senate candidate Brian Vaeth.

On June 24, Brown and Hogan won their respective primaries.  On November 4, Hogan was elected as governor.

Massachusetts 

Governor Deval Patrick was eligible to run for re-election, but decided not to seek a third term.

State Senator and Cape Air CEO Dan Wolf was running for the Democratic nomination, but withdrew after the Ethics Commission ruled his co-ownership of Cape Air violated state conflict of interest rules.

Democratic candidates included PAREXEL executive Joseph Avellone, former Administrator of the Centers for Medicare and Medicaid Services Donald Berwick,  Attorney General Martha Coakley, Treasurer Steve Grossman, and former Assistant Secretary for Intergovernmental Affairs Juliette Kayyem. Coakley won the nomination.

Republican candidates included former Massachusetts cabinet official and 2010 nominee Charlie Baker, and TEA Party member and Shrewsbury small businessman Mark Fisher.
Baker won the nomination.

Michigan 

Governor Rick Snyder sought re-election to a second term and was unopposed in the August 5 party primary. Snyder was elected with 58.1% of the vote in 2010.

Former Representative Mark Schauer was unopposed for the Democratic nomination.

Snyder won re-election to a second term.

Minnesota 

Governor Mark Dayton sought re-election. Dayton was elected with 43.7% of the vote in 2010.
Teacher Rob Farnsworth, investment banker Scott Honour, Hennepin County Commissioner and former State Representative Jeff Johnson, perennial candidate Ole Savior, former Minority Leader of the Minnesota House of Representatives and candidate for Governor in 2010 Marty Seifert, State Senator and former radio host Dave Thompson, and State Representative and former Speaker of the Minnesota House of Representatives Kurt Zellers sought the Republican nomination. Activist Leslie Davis sought the DFL nomination.

Nebraska 

Governor Dave Heineman was term-limited in 2014.

Former Republican Lieutenant Governor Rick Sheehy had been endorsed by Heineman, but Sheehy exited the race due to a report regarding a series of inappropriate phone calls he had made to women who were not his wife. State Senators Tom Carlson, Charlie Janssen, and Beau McCoy also ran for the Republican nomination.  Other potential Republican candidates include Auditor of Public Accounts Mike Foley and businessman Pete Ricketts. The nomination was won by Ricketts.

Executive Director of the Center for Rural Affairs Chuck Hassebrook ran for the Democratic nomination.  State Senator Annette Dubas was also running, but she has withdrawn, leaving Hassebrook the only Democratic candidate. Hassebrook won the nomination.

Ricketts won the election.

Nevada 

Governor Brian Sandoval sought a second term. Sandoval was elected with 53.4% of the vote in 2010.

Anthropology Professor Frederick "Fred" Conquest and Businessman Chris Hyepock ran for the Democratic nomination. Bob Goodman, won the nomination.

Family therapist David Lory VanDerBeek successfully sought the Independent American nomination.

Sandoval won re-election to a second term.

New Hampshire 

Governor Maggie Hassan, elected in 2012 sought re-election. New Hampshire's governors serve two-year terms.

Former U.S. Representative Frank Guinta had not ruled out the possibility of running for the Republican nomination.

New Mexico 

Governor Susana Martinez sought a second term. Martinez was elected with 53.6% of the vote in 2010.

State Attorney General Gary King, the son of former Governor Bruce King Businessman Alan Webber, former New Mexico Director of the Farm Service Agency Lawrence Rael, and State Senator's Howie Morales and Linda Lopez sought the Democratic nomination. King won.

Martinez won re-election to a second term.

New York 

Governor Andrew Cuomo sought re-election. Cuomo was elected with 62.6% of the vote in 2010 over Carl Paladino.
Paladino might seek a rematch. Other potential Republican candidates are Westchester County Executive Rob Astorino, businessman Donald Trump, State Assemblyman Steven McLaughlin, Dutchess County Executive Marcus Molinaro and Harry Wilson, the nominee for State Comptroller in 2010.

Ohio 

Governor John Kasich sought a second term. Kasich was elected with 49.4% of the vote in 2010.

Cuyahoga County Executive Ed FitzGerald and Hamilton County Commissioner Todd Portune are running for the Democratic nomination.

Former Ohio state representative Charlie Earl is running for the Libertarian nomination.

Kasich won re-election to a second term.

Oklahoma 

Governor Mary Fallin sought a second term. Fallin was elected with 60.1% of the vote in 2010.

2010 Republican Party Gubernatorial candidate Randy Brogdon ran again.

State Representative Joe Dorman is the only Democratic candidate who ran.

Fallin won re-election to a second term.

Oregon 

Governor John Kitzhaber sought re-election.  Kitzhaber was elected with 49.2% of the vote in 2010. Kitzhaber won the election.

Pennsylvania 

Incumbent Republican Governor Tom Corbett ran for re-election to a second term but was defeated by the Democratic nominee, Tom Wolf. This marked the first time an incumbent governor running for re-election in Pennsylvania lost.

Democrat Tom Wolf won his party's primary on May 20, 2014, defeating Congresswoman Allyson Schwartz, State Treasurer Rob McCord and former Pennsylvania Secretary of Environmental Protection Kathleen McGinty in a landslide victory.

Rhode Island 

Governor Lincoln Chafee retired after one term in office. Chafee was elected with 36.1% in a competitive three-way race in 2010 in which he ran as an independent. He became a Democrat in May 2013, promoting speculation he would run for a second term, but later announced that he would not run for re-election on September 4, 2013.

Providence Mayor Angel Taveras, State Treasurer Gina Raimondo, and former United States Department of Education official Clay Pell ran for the nomination. Raimondo won the primary election.

Cranston Mayor Allan Fung ran for the Republican nomination.  Moderate Party Chairman Ken Block, who received 6.5% of the vote in the 2010 gubernatorial election, had filed to run again for the Moderate Party.  He has since switched to run as a Republican. Fung won the nomination.

South Carolina 

Governor Nikki Haley sought re-election.  Haley was elected with 51.4% of the vote in 2010.

Democratic 2010 gubernatorial nominee, State Senator Vincent Sheheen, sought a rematch.

On April 11, Tom Ervin announced that he was dropping out of the GOP primary.

Haley won re-election to a second term.

South Dakota 

Governor Dennis Daugaard sought re-election.  Daugaard was elected with 61.5% of the vote in 2010. Republican former State Representative Lora Hubbel has announced a primary challenge to Daugaard.

Joe Lowe, the former Director of Wildland Fire Suppression, ran for the Democratic nomination.  Other speculated candidates included former Commissioner of Schools and Public Lands Bryce Healy, former Congresswoman Stephanie Herseth Sandlin, and Sioux Falls Mayor Mike Huether, but they have all ruled out running for governor.

Daugaard won re-election to a second term.

Tennessee 

Governor Bill Haslam sought re-election. Haslam was elected with 65% of the vote in 2010.

On August 7, Haslam won the Republican nomination with 87.7%. He faced Democrat Charlie Brown, Constitution Party nominee Shaun Crowell, Green Party nominee Isa Infante, and Libertarian Daniel T. Lewis. Haslam won re-election to a second term.

Texas 

Governor Rick Perry was eligible to run for re-election, but chose not to seek a fourth term on July 8, 2013. Perry was re-elected to a third term with 55.1% of the vote in 2010.

Attorney General Greg Abbott was the Republican Party nominee, having defeated perennial candidate Larry Kilgore, Lisa Fritsch and former Univision personality Miriam Martinez in the Republican primary.

State Senator Wendy Davis was the Democratic Party nominee.
Abbott won the election with 59.3% of the vote.

Vermont 

Governor Peter Shumlin, re-elected in 2012, sought re-election. Vermont governors serve two-year terms. He faced Republican businessman Scott Milne, among many other candidates, in the general election.

Since no candidate received more than 50% of the vote, the Vermont General Assembly voted to choose the winner, of which Shumlin won re-election by a vote of 110–69, with one abstention.

Wisconsin 

Governor Scott Walker sought re-election. Walker was elected with 52.3% of the vote in 2010 and was subject to an unsuccessful recall election in 2012, which he won with 53.1% of the vote.

Former Wisconsin Secretary of Commerce Mary Burke ran for the Democratic nomination.

Walker was re-elected to a second term.

Wyoming 

Governor Matt Mead sought re-election. Mead was elected with 65.68% of the vote in 2010.  He won the GOP primary on August 19, 2014, with 55% of the vote against Taylor Haynes (32%) and Cindy Hill (13%).
The Democratic nominee is Pete Gosar.

Territories and federal district

District of Columbia 

Mayor Vincent C. Gray sought re-election. Gray was elected with 74.2% of the vote in 2010.

Gray faced a competitive primary with challenges from four members of the district council, including Muriel Bowser, Jack Evans, Vincent Orange, and Tommy Wells, as well as former State Department official Reta Jo Lewis and activist Andy Shallal. Bowser defeated Gray for the Democratic nomination by over 10 points.

David Catania, another district councilman, and Carol Schwartz, a former councilwoman and perennial candidate, ran in the general election as independents. Other candidates included Libertarian nominee Bruce Majors and Statehood Green nominee Faith Dane.

Bowser won the election, becoming the second female mayor of the District of Columbia since Sharon Pratt left office in 1995. She was also elected to the lowest share of the vote in Washington, D.C. history.

Guam 

Governor Eddie Calvo ran for re-election to a second term. Calvo was elected with 50.61% of the vote in 2010, defeating former Democratic Governor Carl Gutierrez.

In June 2014, Gutierrez announced his intention to challenge Governor Calvo, setting up a rematch of the 2010 gubernatorial contest.

Calvo won re-election to a second term.

Northern Mariana Islands 

Governor Eloy Inos, who was elected as lieutenant governor in 2009 as a member of the Covenant Party, succeeded his predecessor Benigno Fitial (R) upon the latter's resignation on February 20, 2013, sought a full term. In September 2013 he moved to re-unify the Covenant Party with the Republican Party, and is running as a Republican in 2014. His running mate is Senate President Ralph Torres (R-Saipan).

Former Ports Authority executive director Edward "Tofila" Deleon Guerrero is running as a Democrat, with former representative Danny Quitugua as his running mate.

Former Republican Governor Juan Babauta is running as an independent, with former Republican Senator Juan Torres as his running mate.

2009 Republican candidate Heinz Hofschneider ran as an independent, with Senator Ray Yumul (I-Saipan) as his running mate.

Inos won election to a full term.

U.S. Virgin Islands 

Governor John de Jongh was term-limited in 2014. He was re-elected with 56.3% of the vote in 2010.

U.S. House delegate Donna Christian-Christensen won the Democratic primary against a crowded field of candidates, which included former territorial legislator Adlah Donastorg Jr., incumbent lieutenant governor Gregory Francis, and former lieutenant governor Gerard Luz James. Among the independent candidates were former court judge Soraya Diase Coffelt and former lieutenant governor Kenneth Mapp, who sought the governorship for the third time in a row.

After a runoff was held when no candidate reached a majority of votes, Mapp won the election.

See also
2014 United States elections
2014 United States Senate elections
2014 United States House of Representatives elections

Notes

References